Slopalinida is a heterokont order.

See also 
 David J. Patterson

References 

Placidozoa
Heterokont orders